Fuel cells and hydrogen may refer to:

 a hydrogen cell, a kind of fuel cell
 the European Fuel Cells and Hydrogen Joint Technology Initiative